Mamadou Tounkara (born 19 January 1996) is a Senegalese footballer who plays as a forward for Italian  club Avellino on loan from Cittadella.

Club career

Early career
Born in Blanes, Girona, Catalonia, to Senegalese parents, Tounkara first began playing football with FC Barcelona's youth academy. In 2011, he was loaned to Centre D'Esports Farners in Selva. Tounkara had a release clause of 3 million euro written into his Barcelona contract but injuries saw the club lose interest in the striker.

Lazio
After his Barcelona contract expired, Serie A club Lazio signed Tounkara to a three-year deal in August 2012. In Rome, he joined his former Barcelona teammate Keita Baldé. Tounkara spent his first two seasons with the club playing in the Primavera youth team, first under Alberto Bollini and later under Simone Inzaghi. As a promising player, he was also selected to join the senior squad at pre-season camp in Auronzo di Cadore.

Having been training with the first team, Tounkara made his Serie A debut in the final match of the 2013–14 season, which Lazio won 1–0 at the Stadio Olimpico against Bologna. Tounkara came off the bench to replace Miroslav Klose in the 81st minute of the game.

Crotone (loan)
In July 2015, Mamadou Tounkara was transferred to Crotone on loan. The deal included a buy-out option for Crotone, while Lazio have a buy-back option.

Salernitana (loan)
On 1 February 2016, Tounkara joined Salernitana on loan until the end of the season.

Flamurtari (loan)
On 30 January 2017, Tounkara joined Flamurtari on loan until the end of the season.

Schaffhausen (loan)
On 3 July 2018, Tounkara joined Schaffhausen on loan.

Zemplín Michalovce (loan)
On 1 February 2019, he joined Zemplín Michalovce on loan.

Viterbese
On 11 August 2019, he transferred to Serie C club Viterbese and signed a 2-year contract.

Cittadella
On 14 July 2021, he joined Serie B side Cittadella.

Avellino
On 19 January 2023, he transferred to Serie C club Avellino on loan with an obligation to buy.

International career

Tounkara is eligible to represent both Spain and Senegal at international level. In 2012, he received a call-up to the Spain under-17 team. Four years later, Tounkara revealed his decision to play for Senegal.

References

External links

1996 births
Spanish people of Senegalese descent
People from Selva
Sportspeople from the Province of Girona
Living people
Senegalese footballers
Association football forwards
Spanish footballers
Footballers from Catalonia
S.S. Lazio players
F.C. Crotone players
U.S. Salernitana 1919 players
Flamurtari Vlorë players
FC Schaffhausen players
MFK Zemplín Michalovce players
U.S. Viterbese 1908 players
A.S. Cittadella players
U.S. Avellino 1912 players
Serie A players
Serie B players
Serie C players
Slovak Super Liga players
Spanish expatriate footballers
Expatriate footballers in Italy
Spanish expatriate sportspeople in Italy
Expatriate footballers in Albania
Spanish expatriate sportspeople in Albania
Expatriate footballers in Switzerland
Spanish expatriate sportspeople in Switzerland
Expatriate footballers in Slovakia
Spanish expatriate sportspeople in Slovakia